Grudne-Yermaki is a rural locality (a khutor) in Khopyorskoye Rural Settlement, Novonikolayevsky District, Volgograd Oblast, Russia. The population was 50 as of 2010.

Geography 
Grudne-Yermaki is located on the Khopyorsko-Buzulukskaya Plain, 45 km ENE of Novonikolayevsky (the district's administrative centre) by road. Khopyorsky is the nearest rural locality.

References 

Rural localities in Novonikolayevsky District